"Another Sad Love Song" is a song by American singer-songwriter Toni Braxton. Written and produced by Daryl Simmons and Babyface, featuring additional production from L.A. Reid, it was released as the lead single and its opening track from Braxton's self-titled debut album (1993) on June 11, 1993, by LaFace Records and Arista Records. Lyrically, it talks about Braxton complaining that every song played on the radio is a reminder of her ex-boyfriend.

"Another Sad Love Song" received widespread acclaim from music critics and earned Braxton her first-ever Grammy Award for Best Female R&B Vocal Performance at the 36th Annual Grammy Awards. It proved to be a success, giving Braxton her first top ten hit on the US Billboard Hot 100 and the Adult Contemporary, while narrowly missing the top position of Billboards Hot R&B/Hip-Hop Songs by peaking at number two. Internationally, the song reached the top twenty in Canada and the United Kingdom, the top thirty in Iceland and the Netherlands, and the top forty in Scotland and on a composite Eurochart Hot 100.

Three different music videos for the song were produced. The first version was filmed in 1992 in black-and-white and featured the original music. The second version was filmed in May 1993 and was shown in color with exterior scenes from the first version. The third version was remixed to appeal to a wider audiences and was primarily shown in Europe. "Another Sad Love Song" has been performed at most of Braxton's concerts, and is featured on many of her greatest hits collections, including Ultimate Toni Braxton (2003), Platinum & Gold Collection (2004), The Essential Toni Braxton (2007) and Breathe Again: The Best of Toni Braxton (2009).

Background and composition
After Braxton released her first solo single, "Love Shoulda Brought You Home", in 1992, as the soundtrack of the film Boomerang, which became her first top-40 on the Billboard Hot 100 chart, she released "Another Sad Love Song" as the lead single from her self-titled debut album, Toni Braxton, on June 11, 1993.

"Another Sad Love Song" was written and produced by Babyface and Daryl Simmons, with L.A. Reid also producing it. Lyrically, "Another Sad Love Song" talks about Braxton complaining that every song played on the radio is a reminder of her ex-boyfriend. In the chorus, she sings, "It’s just another sad love song/Rackin’ my brain like crazy/Guess I’m all torn up/Be it fast or slow/It doesn’t let go/Or shake me/And it’s all because of you."

Critical reception
The song received positive reviews from the majority of the music critics. Ron Wynn of AllMusic named it a highlight from the album, writing that "Braxton's husky, enticing voice sounds hypnotic on the dismayed track." Daryl Easlea of BBC Music praised that it "showed how well an accomplished production team could perform when married with a superior vocalist." Larry Flick from Billboard commented, "Braxton cleanly proves herself as a future diva on this slow and rhythmic urban ballad". He added, "The cool thing about Toni is that she's clearly not afraid to get vocally raw and raspy, even when the instrumentation is as smooth as it is here. That kind of edge places this already delicious jam head-and-shoulders above the ever-crowded competitive ranks." Mitchell May of Chicago Tribune was very positive, writing that on the track, "the ache in her voice is all too real." Dave Sholin from the Gavin Report described it as "another L.A., Babyface and Daryl Simmons masterpiece by an artist with a great future". 

Connie Johnson of Los Angeles Times praised Braxton for "going to town on the soul-infused track." Ralph Tee from Music Weeks RM Dance Update stated that she "steps out with a vocal Whitney would be proud of on a stylish, medium-paced two stepper that grows on you." Another editor, James Hamilton, deemed it a "superb sultry slinky jogger". A reviewer from People Magazine called its intro "coiling, almost eerie", "bolstered by her full-throated alto." John McAlley of Rolling Stone was extremely positive, writing that, "Another Sad Love Song – with its dynamic vocal, gargantuan hook and clever song-with-in-a-song lyric – surely ranks with 'End of the Road', 'I'm Your Baby Tonight' and 'Every Little Step' as one of LaFace's greatest triumphs." McAlley also wrote the song "reinforces Braxton's lovelorn persona, as do several other midtempo ballads that L.A., Babyface and Daryl Simmons have front-loaded into Toni Braxton." 

"Another Sad Love Song" became Braxton's first song to receive a Grammy Award nomination in 1994, for the category "Best R&B Vocal Performance, Female", ultimately winning the award.

Chart performance
"Another Sad Love Song" became Braxton's first top-10 hit on the Billboard Hot 100 chart, peaking at number seven, while on the Hot R&B/Hip-Hop Songs, the song reached higher, peaking at number 2. The single sold 500,000 copies domestically, earning a gold certification from the Recording Industry Association of America. In 1993, the song charted on the UK Singles Chart, reaching a peak of number 51, on September 18. However, in 1994, the song peaked at number 15, becoming its official peak position, on April 2. Elsewhere, the song performed modestly, reaching number 23 on the Dutch Top 40 chart and number 44 on the New Zealand Singles Chart.

Music video

The music video for "Another Sad Love Song" was released in three different versions. The first version was directed by Antoine Fuqua and filmed in 1992 in black-and-white and featured the original music. The second version was directed by Fuqua and Ralph Ziman and filmed in May 1993 and was shown in color with exterior scenes from the first version. The third version was remixed to appeal to a wider audiences and was primarily shown in Europe.

On her DVD, "From Toni with Love... The Video Collection", two versions of the video are also featured: the "black and white" and the "colorful version". Braxton commented that she "was really feeling the song, because I was ending a relationship," she said.

Track listings

 US CD single "Another Sad Love Song" (remix radio edit) – 4:40
 "Another Sad Love Song" (extended remix) – 5:27
 "Another Sad Love Song" (Smoothed Out version) – 4:23
 "Another Sad Love Song" (remix instrumental) – 5:01
 "Another Sad Love Song" (album version) – 5:01

 UK CD single (1993) "Another Sad Love Song" (radio edit) – 3:53
 "Give U My Heart" (album radio edit) (Babyface featuring Toni Braxton) – 4:09
 "Another Sad Love Song" (Smoothed Out version) – 4:23
 "Another Sad Love Song" (album version) – 5:01

 UK CD single (1994) "Another Sad Love Song" (album version) – 5:01
 "Another Sad Love Song" (remix radio edit) – 4:43
 "Another Sad Love Song" (extended remix) – 5:28
 "Another Sad Love Song" (Smoothed Out version) – 4:23

 German CD single "Another Sad Love Song" (radio edit) – 3:53
 "Another Sad Love Song" (Smoothed Out version) – 4:23
 "Another Sad Love Song" (extended remix) – 5:28
 "Another Sad Love Song" (album version) – 5:01

 UK collectors EP'''
 "Another Sad Love Song" (album version) – 5:01
 "Breathe Again" (live from The Apollo) – 4:30
 "Best Friend" (album version) – 4:28
 "Give U My Heart" (Boomerang'' version) (Babyface featuring Toni Braxton) – 5:04

Charts and certifications

Weekly charts

Year-end charts

Certifications

Release history

References

1992 songs
1993 songs
1993 singles
Arista Records singles
LaFace Records singles
Music videos directed by Antoine Fuqua
Song recordings produced by Babyface (musician)
Song recordings produced by Daryl Simmons
Song recordings produced by L.A. Reid
Songs about heartache
Songs about music
Songs written by Babyface (musician)
Songs written by Daryl Simmons
Toni Braxton songs